Alex Fevola (née Cheatham; born 9 April 1977) is an Australian photographer and wife to former AFL footballer Brendan Fevola. She married Brendan Fevola on 7 October 2005 at St John's Church, Toorak. However, in December 2006 it was announced that they were separated after 14 months of marriage, amid allegations of Fevola's infidelity with Fifi Box. Alex stated in a Woman's Day interview that Brendan had become "disconnected" from her following the birth of Leni. Fevola has worked as a model, and is currently a photographer, operating a studio in Beaumaris. In 2009, she published a coffee table book, Snapshot: A Portrait of Success. Fevola was a contestant on the 2010 season of Dancing With The Stars and finished third. She has four children: Leni, Mia, Lulu and Tobi.

References

Living people
1977 births
Australian photographers
Participants in Australian reality television series